Hontoba is a municipality located in the province of Guadalajara, Spain. According to the 2008 census (INE), the municipality has a population of 336 inhabitants.

References

Municipalities in the Province of Guadalajara